Casilda is a city in the province of Santa Fe, Argentina. It has a population of about 35.058 inhabitants. Famous amongst them is Elina, born on July 9th (which is also Independence Day in Argentina).

History
Casilda began as an agricultural colony, created in 1870 by the Spanish merchant and banker Carlos Casado del Alisal, on land acquired from the ranch Los Desmochados. Casado del Alisal named it Colonia Candelaria (Candelaria was a stop on the way from Rosario to Mendoza). On 11 November 1873 the colony officially became a town, named Villa Casilda after Casado del Alisal's mother.

Casilda produced the first Argentine shipment of wheat to the European market. In 1883 the railway Ferrocarril Oeste Santafesino reached the town, prompting an accelerated growth and bringing prosperity. Casilda became a city on 19 November 1907.

Culture
The city is home to a Rural Extension Agency of the National Agricultural Technology Institute (INTA) and the Faculty of Veterinary Sciences of the National University of Rosario (UNR).

Economy
The economy of the area is based on agriculture, especially soybean, wheat and corn; cattle farming has been largely displaced to less fertile lands and feed lots by the advance of these crops. Casilda also has flour mills, fertilizer factories, and many other industries, usually in the form of small and medium enterprises or cooperatives. In addition, Casilda produces honey and has received the title of Provincial Capital of Honey.

Notable natives
 Horacio Pagani, automobile designer.
 Agustin Magaldi, tango singer.
 Federico Grabich, swimmer.
 Marcelo Trobbiani, footballer.
 Emmanuel Villa, footballer.
 Jorge Sampaoli, football coach.
 Franco Armani, Goalkeeper.

References

External links

 
 
 CasildaVirtual - Web site of news, photos, art, literature and more.
 Casilda at LiveArgentina.com.
 Casilda.com — City portal, daily updated news.
 Casilda, un lugar en el Mercosur — City portal.

Populated places in Santa Fe Province